Mount Cottrell is a town in Victoria, Australia,  west of Melbourne's Central Business District, located within the Cities of Melton and Wyndham local government areas. Mount Cottrell recorded a population of 496 at the 2021 census.

It is named after Anthony Cottrell, a member of the Port Phillip association who was allotted the land by the company in about 1835–36. The original "No.10" hut was located about 1.5 km north of the Mount Cottrell summit.

The town of Mount Cottrell consists of mainly privately owned open land. The town is named after the 200m high mountain it encompasses, Mount Cottrell, the most massive of the Werribee Plains volcanoes, a volcanic cone formed by the radial eruption of numerous lava tongues. The mountain was purchased by Melton Council in 2007 to preserve the significant geological and flora and fauna values on the site.

Mount Cottrell Post Office opened on 1 January 1866, closed in 1895, reopened in 1902 and closed again in 1958.

Mount Cottrell massacre

The Mount Cottrell massacre was a reprisal killing for squatter Charles Franks and his convict shepherd Thomas Flinders by Aboriginal people. Around 10 Wathaurong people were murdered at Mt Cottrell by 17 settlers armed with muskets on 16 July 1836.

External links

References

Towns in Victoria (Australia)
City of Melton
City of Wyndham